Vesta Temple is a  summit located in the Grand Canyon, in Coconino County of northern Arizona, US. It is situated eight miles west-northwest of Grand Canyon Village, and immediately northeast of Mimbreno Point. Marsh Butte is one mile northeast, Eremita Mesa immediately southeast, and nearest higher neighbor Diana Temple is one mile north. Vesta Temple is named for Vesta, the goddess of the hearth, home, and family according to Roman mythology. Clarence Dutton began the practice of naming geographical features in the Grand Canyon after mythological deities. This geographical feature's name was officially adopted in 1908 by the U.S. Board on Geographic Names. According to the Köppen climate classification system, Vesta Temple is located in a Cold semi-arid climate zone.

Geology

The summit of Vesta Temple is composed of Permian Kaibab Limestone and Toroweap Formation overlaying cream-colored, cliff-forming, Permian Coconino Sandstone. The sandstone, which is the third-youngest of the strata in the Grand Canyon, was deposited 265 million years ago as sand dunes. Below the Coconino Sandstone is reddish, slope-forming, Permian Hermit Formation, which in turn overlays the Pennsylvanian-Permian Supai Group. Further down are strata of the conspicuous cliff-forming Mississippian Redwall Limestone, the Cambrian Tonto Group, and finally granite of the Paleoproterozoic Vishnu Basement Rocks at river level in Granite Gorge. Precipitation runoff from Vesta Temple drains northeast to the Colorado River via Topaz Canyon and Boucher Creek.

See also
 Geology of the Grand Canyon area

References

External links

 Weather forecast: National Weather Service
 Vesta Temple photo from Mimbreno Point
 Vesta Temple photo by Harvey Butchart

Grand Canyon
Landforms of Coconino County, Arizona
Buttes of Arizona
Mountains of Coconino County, Arizona
Colorado Plateau
Grand Canyon National Park
North American 1000 m summits
Grand Canyon, South Rim
Grand Canyon, South Rim (west)
Vesta (mythology)